The Moorlands Sixth Form College is a Sixth Form College located in Cheadle, a historic market town in Staffordshire, England. The college caters for years 12-13, where students can gain A-Level and AS-Level qualifications, with results above the national standards. The college is run as a partnership of 3 local high schools; Painsley Catholic College, The Cheadle Academy and Moorside High School, and acts as the sixth form for students of all partnership schools.

Leadership 
The Moorlands is led by a Senior Leader (Mrs C Dodson) elected by the representatives of Painsley Catholic College (Mr S G Bell), The Cheadle Academy (Mr N Jamieson) & Moorside High School (Mr S Clarke) and all decisions and changes within the college are made as a group by these four leaders.

Links with Painsley Catholic College 
Painsley Catholic College is a Roman Catholic secondary school with academy status situated in Cheadle, Staffordshire and is one of the leading schools in the country. Painsley is part of the Painsley Catholic multi-academy company consisting of the high school and 6 feeder primary schools. Painsley consistently achieves excellent grades at GCSE and students attending Painsley are encouraged to continue these excellent grades at the Moorlands VIth form College. The teaching staff at the Moorlands VIth are from all three contributing high schools. The Moorlands VIth form campus is located adjacent to Painsley Academy and students from the VIth form can use the Cheadle Schools sports hall facility based on the Cheadle High School Academy.

Links with The Cheadle Academy 
The Cheadle Academy is located within a 5-minute walk from the sixth form & Painsley campus and a large amount of Moorlands teaching staff are from The Cheadle Academy.

Links with Moorside High School 
Moorside High school is located furthest away from the sixth form, in the town of Werrington, on the borders of Stoke-On-Trent and provides a small number of teaching staff to the college.

Curriculum 
The Moorlands Sixth Form teaches physics, chemistry, biology, mathematics, English language and literature, German, French, Spanish, philosophy, religion  and ethics, computing, geography, history, art, textiles, product design, beliefs and values, business studies, economics, performing arts, health and social care, sociology, psychology, vocational business, media studies, advanced mathematics, physical education, music, and drama.

Alumni
 Adam Yates, professional footballer
 Gareth Owen, professional footballer
 Rachel Shenton, actress
 Adam Peaty, swimmer
 Levison Wood, explorer

Examination Results 
See link for all exam results.

Moorlands Sixth Form College consistently gains some of the top A-Level results in Stoke-On-Trent, Staffordshire and the Midlands.

The college gained the top A-Level results in Staffordshire in 2014 and 2015

External links
 Moorlands VI Form College Homepage

References

Sixth form colleges in Staffordshire